Motu is a district of Vavaʻu division, Tonga.

References 

Vavaʻu